Sahu Ramesh Chandra Jain (15 August 1925 – 22 September 2004) was a leading mediaperson, philanthropist, promoter of Indian literature, and a prominent member of the Jain religion. He was a descendant of the well-known Sahu Jain family of Najibabad (Bijnor District, Uttar Pradesh).

References 

1925 births
2004 deaths
Businesspeople from Uttar Pradesh
Banaras Hindu University alumni
People from Bijnor district
The Times Group people
20th-century Indian Jains
21st-century Indian Jains